Samantha Sheehan (born May 20, 1986) is an American artistic gymnast. She won the bronze medal on floor exercise at the 2002 World Championships. Following her elite career she competed collegiately for the Georgia Gym Dogs.

References

1986 births
Living people
American female artistic gymnasts
Medalists at the World Artistic Gymnastics Championships
Sportspeople from Cincinnati
U.S. women's national team gymnasts
21st-century American women